Cyatholaimidae is a family of nematodes belonging to the order Desmodorida.

Genera:
 Acanthonchus Cobb, 1920
 Achromadora Cobb, 1913
 Anaxonchiym

References

Nematodes